Honeysuckle & Lightning Bugs is the debut studio album by American rapper Blanco Brown, released on October 11, 2019, by TrailerTrapMusic and BMG Rights Management. It features the single "The Git Up" and all four tracks from his debut EP Blanco Brown (2019).

Critical reception
Rating it 1.5 out of 5 stars, Stephen Thomas Erlewine of AllMusic thought that the combination of country music and trap music elements made the album "sluggish" and "threadbare". He wrote in his review that the production choices "give the album a heavy, dour blandness that doesn't sit well with Brown's decision to signify his country roots by ratcheting up the sentimentality".

Commercial performance
The album debuted on Top Country Albums at No. 16, with 1,200 copies sold the first week. It has sold 4,100 copies in the United States as of January 2020.

Track listing

Charts

References

2019 debut albums
Blanco Brown albums
BBR Music Group albums